Pacific Gas & Electric was an American rock band in the late 1960s and early 1970s, led by singer Charlie Allen.  Their biggest hit was the gospel-tinged "Are You Ready?" in 1970.

Music
The band's music encompasses blues, blues rock, soul, soul-rock, psychedelic rock, jazz and jazz-rock.

History
The band was formed in Los Angeles, California, United States, in 1967, by guitarist Tom Marshall, bassist Brent Block, lead guitarist Glenn Schwartz (formerly of The James Gang) and drummer Charlie Allen, who had previously played in the band Bluesberry Jam. When it became clear that Allen was the best singer in the new group, he became the front man, and Frank Cook, previously of Canned Heat, came into the band on drums.

Originally known as the Pacific Gas and Electric Blues Band, they shortened their name when they signed to Kent Records, releasing the album Get It On in early 1968. The record was not a success, but following the band's performance at the Miami Pop Festival in December 1968, they were signed by Columbia Records.

Their first album for Columbia, Pacific Gas and Electric, was issued in 1969, but they achieved greater success with their next album, Are You Ready, in 1970. The title track "Are You Ready?" reached No. 14 on the Billboard Hot 100.

After the album was recorded, Cook was injured in a car accident and was replaced on drums by Ron Woods, Cook staying on as manager. Marshall and Schwartz left and were replaced by Frank Petricca (bass) and Ken Utterback (guitar), with Brent Block moving to rhythm guitar before leaving later in 1970. Unusually for the time, the band contained both black and white musicians, which led to rioting and gunfire on one occasion when the band, who toured widely, performed in Raleigh, North Carolina.  Film footage of the band playing at the Kentucky federal narcotics farm exists and was used
for the imagery in a later music video.

In 1971, the band changed their name to PG&E, following pressure from the utility company of the same name (ironically, decades after the band split up, the utility would start calling itself PG&E). The band also expanded, Allen, Woods, Petricca and Utterback being joined by Jerry Aiello (keyboards), Stanley Abernathy (trumpet), Alfred Galagos and Virgil Gonsalves (saxophones), and Joe Lala (percussion). They recorded the album PG&E, and also appeared in and provided music for the Otto Preminger film Tell Me That You Love Me, Junie Moon starring Liza Minnelli. The band then split up.

For a time the group also included Rick Durrett on keyboards, formerly of the band The Coven.

A final album, using the name Pacific Gas & Electric Starring Charlie Allen, was recorded by Allen with studio musicians and released on the Dunhill label in 1973.

Members' lives post-band
Tom Marshall later suffered deteriorating health and personal circumstances, being homeless since the 1980s.

Frank Petricca became a commodity broker.

Charlie Allen died on May 7, 1990, aged 48.

Glenn Schwartz became the guitarist for the Gospel rock group All Saved Freak Band. He died on November 3, 2018, aged 77.

Frank Cook became a qualified psychologist, and died on July 9, 2021, aged 79.

Discography

Albums

Singles

References

Musical groups established in 1967
Musical groups disestablished in 1973
Musical groups from Los Angeles
American blues rock musical groups
American psychedelic rock music groups
1967 establishments in California
1973 disestablishments in California
Columbia Records artists
Kent Records artists
Dunhill Records artists